Baba Ramdev is a 1963 Rajasthani language devotional feature film directed by Nawal Mathur and Manibhai Vyas, and based on the life of the Hindu folk deity Ramdev Pir.

Background
The film was made in the 1960s and became a big commercial success, being considered a hit for Rajasthani cinema.  This was a milestone in the history of the Rajasthani movie industry.

The popular bhajan songs "Khamma Khamma" and "Runecha ra Dhaniya" are from this movie.

Re-release
88 Rajasthani films had been produced in the period of mid-1942 to 2004. With the emergence of VCD and DVD technology, films which had otherwise been unavailable for years have become marketable and are being re-released in video format. Baba Ramdev was re-released by 'Modern Videos of Ajmer'.

Cast
Mahipal
Anita Guha
Ratna Bhushan
Deepak 
Madhumati
Dalda
Sarita
Lalita Desai
B.M. Vyas
Mohan Modi

References

External links

1963 films
Indian biographical films
Rajasthani-language films
1960s biographical films